Pacific Heights is a neighborhood of San Francisco.

Pacific Heights may also refer to:

Pacific Heights, Queensland, a locality in the Shire of Livingstone, Australia
Pacific Heights, Saskatoon, Saskatchewan
Pacific Heights (film), a 1990 American psychological thriller directed by John Schlesinger